Shooters Hill Sixth Form College is a large mixed further education college for students aged 16–19, located in Shooter's Hill in the Royal Borough of Greenwich, London, England.

History
The college opened in 2002, and occupies some buildings previously used for secondary school education since 1928.

The school was initially Woolwich County School (created when Woolwich Polytechnic Boys Secondary School, a secondary school established alongside Woolwich Polytechnic in 1897, split into two sites in 1928; the other is now Woolwich Polytechnic School for Boys), and later (1935) became Shooter's Hill Grammar School. This amalgamated with Bloomfield Road School (Woolwich Secondary School for Boys) in 1973 and reopened as Eaglesfield Secondary School in November 1978, becoming a sixth form campus in 2002.

It is a member of the Sixth Form Colleges' Association.

Notable alumni

Woolwich County School
 Tommy Flowers MBE, who designed and built the WWII Colossus computer at the Post Office Research Station
 Prince Littler CBE and Emile Littler, both theatrical impresarios

Shooter's Hill Grammar School

 Ginger Baker, drummer with Cream
 Adrian Biddle, famous cinematographer
 Jools Holland, musician and TV presenter
 Frankie Howerd, actor and comedian
 Graham Johnson, Kent cricketer
 Philip Mackie, screenwriter with the Ministry of Information films, and grandfather of actress Pearl Mackie
 Terence James Reed, Taylor Professor of the German Language and Literature from 1989–2004 at the University of Oxford
 Jack Rose, RAF fighter pilot and colonial administrator
 William G. Stewart, television producer
 Steve Peregrin Took, musician with T. Rex (band)
 Steve White, drummer with The Style Council in the 1980s

Eaglesfield School
 Craig Fairbrass, actor (EastEnders, Cliffhanger) 
 Marvin Humes, member of JLS, television presenter and radio host
 Krsna, rapper
 Lee Murray, MMA fighter and mastermind behind the Tunbridge Wells Securitas depot robbery

References

Secondary schools in the Royal Borough of Greenwich
Educational institutions established in 2002
2002 establishments in England
Further education colleges in London